Three Arrows Cooperative Society is a cooperative summer colony located in Putnam Valley, NY.  It was founded in 1936 by members of the Young People's Socialist League, from whence its name and emblem derive. The Society owns 125 acres of land which comprise 75 individual home sites as well as several communal buildings and access to Barger Pond. The colony, sometimes known as Camp Three Arrows, was imbued with socialist and communitarian values and offers a wide range of cultural, educational and leisure activities.

Notable Three Arrows members include author Bruno Fischer, labor leader Israel Kugler, political activist Samuel H. Friedman and poet Peretz Kaminsky. The Socialist Party of America held its annual conventions at Three Arrows and the Three Arrows Social Hall is named for its perennial presidential candidate Norman Thomas, a regular visitor. Historically many Three Arrows members were active in progressive political organizations including the Arbeiter Ring, the Jewish Labor Committee and the League for Industrial Democracy as well as many aspects of the Labor Movement.  The Student League for Industrial Democracy, later known as Students For A Democratic Society or SDS, held meetings at Three Arrows during the 1950s and early 60s.

Three Arrows is member-run, with no paid staff other than an onsite caretaker and some teenage lifeguards during the summer months. There is an elaborate system of committees, with each member expected to serve on one or more committees and perform the work required to maintain the cooperative.  As in other cooperatives, members own shares in the society rather than holding title to their individual sites.

Three Arrows remains a vibrant summer community whose membership includes descendants of the founders as well as others drawn to the natural beauty of the location and active community life.

See also
Three Arrows

References

External links 
 
 Records of Three Arrows Cooperative Society at The Tamiment Library, New York University
 "Three Arrows, a Co-op That Loves Its Committees" New York Times July 20, 2010 
 "A NYC Mom Finds a Hudson River Haven" NYMetroParents.com June 6, 2007
 The Whistling Wolves performing at Three Arrows, August 2010

1936 establishments in New York (state)
Housing cooperatives in the United States
Intentional communities in New York (state)
Organizations established in 1936
Putnam County, New York
Socialist Party of America